Basilides (or Basileides, ; c. 250 – c. 175 BC) was an Epicurean philosopher, who succeeded Dionysius of Lamptrai as the head of the Epicurean school at Athens. c. 205 CE. It is not certain who succeeded Basilides: Apollodorus is the next Epicurean leader we can be certain about, but there may have been at least one intermediate leader, and the name Thespis has been suggested. Barnes and Brunschwig suggested that Basilides of Tyre and Basilides the Epicurean could be the same Basilides.

See also
List of Epicurean philosophers

Notes

References

2nd-century BC Greek people
2nd-century BC philosophers
Epicurean philosophers
Hellenistic-era philosophers in Athens